Ballinderry may refer to:

Northern Ireland
 Ballinderry, a parish on the border between Counties Londonderry and Tyrone
Ballinderry Shamrocks, Gaelic Athletic Association club
 Ballinderry, Kilcronaghan civil parish, a townland in County Londonderry
 Ballinderry, County Antrim, a civil parish and townland in County Antrim
 Lower Ballinderry, a small village in County Antrim
 Upper Ballinderry, a small village in County Antrim
 Ballinderry railway station, a disused railway station near Upper Ballinderry
 Ballinderry River, near Cookstown, County Tyrone

Republic of Ireland
 Ballinderry, Tuam, County Galway
 Ballinderry, County Roscommon
 Ballinderry, County Tipperary
 Ballinderry, County Westmeath